Bouteloua is a genus of plants in the grass family. Members of the genus are commonly known as grama grass.

Taxonomy and systematics 
The genus was named for Claudio and Esteban Boutelou, 19th-century Spanish botanists. David Griffiths produced a 1912 monograph on the genus.

Description

Bouteloua includes both annual and perennial grasses, which frequently form stolons. Species have an inflorescence of 1 to 80 racemes or spikes positioned alternately on the culm (stem). The rachis (stem) of the spike is flattened. The spikelets are positioned along one side of the spike. Each spikelet contains one fertile floret, and usually one sterile floret.

Distribution 
Bouteloua is found only the Americas, with most diversity centered in the southwestern United States.

Uses 
Many species are important livestock forage, especially blue grama.

Species
Species of Bouteloua include:
 Bouteloua alamosana Vasey – Mesoamerica
 Bouteloua americana (L.) Scribn. – American grama – southern Mexico, Central America, West Indies, northern South America
 Bouteloua annua Swallen – Baja California Sur, Sonora
 Bouteloua aristidoides (Kunth) Griseb. – needle grama – United States (California, Arizona, Nevada, Utah, New Mexico, Texas); Mexico, South America, Aruba
 Bouteloua barbata Lag. – six-weeks grama – United States, Mexico
 Bouteloua bracteata (McVaugh) Columbus – Michoacán
 Bouteloua breviseta Vasey – United States, Mexico
 Bouteloua chondrosioides (Kunth) Benth. ex S.Watson – sprucetop grama – United States (AZ TX); Mesoamerica
 Bouteloua curtipendula (Michx.) Torr. – sideoats grama – widespread in USA, Canada, Mexico
 Bouteloua dactyloides (Nutt.) Columbus – buffalograss – USA, Canada, Mexico
 Bouteloua dimorpha Columbus – Great Plains in USA, Canada, Mexico, Honduras, Cuba, Trinidad
 Bouteloua distans Swallen – Mexico
 Bouteloua disticha (Kunth) Benth. – from southern Mexico to Ecuador; also Cuba, Galápagos
 Bouteloua eludens Griffiths – USA (Arizona, New Mexico), Mexico (Chihuahua, Coahuila, Sonora)
 Bouteloua eriopoda (Torr.) Torr. – United States, Mexico
 Bouteloua gracilis (Willd. ex Kunth) Lag. ex Griffiths – blue grama – Great Plains in USA, Canada, Mexico
 Bouteloua hirsuta Lag. – USA (Great Plains, Southwest), Mexico, Guatemala
 Bouteloua johnstonii Swallen – Coahuila
 Bouteloua juncea (Desv. ex Beauv.) A.S.Hitchc. – lamilla – Cuba, Hispaniola, Puerto Rico
 Bouteloua media (E.Fourn.) Gould & Kapadia – from central Mexico to Uruguay
 Bouteloua megapotamica (Spreng.) Kuntze – Argentina, Brazil, Uruguay, Bolivia
 Bouteloua mexicana (Scribn.) Columbus – Mexico, Belize, Guatemala, Honduras
 Bouteloua multifida (Griffiths) Columbus – from Sonora to Oaxaca
 Bouteloua nervata Swallen – Hidalgo, México State
 Bouteloua parryi (E. Fourn.) Griffiths – Parry's Grama, Texas, Arizona, New Mexico, Northern Mexico
 Bouteloua pectinata (Bouteloua hirsuta var. pectinata) – tall grama, eyebrow grass – Texas
 Bouteloua pedicellata Swallen – Puebla, Hidalgo, Guanajuato, Tlaxcala, Nuevo León, Veracruz 
 Bouteloua polymorpha (E.Fourn.) Columbus – from Durango to Oaxaca
 Bouteloua purpurea Gould & Kapadia – Guanajuato, D.F., San Luis Potosí, México State, Hidalgo, Querétaro
 Bouteloua radicosa (E. Fourn.) Griffiths – purple grama – USA (Arizona, New Mexico), Mexico (Chihuahua, Michoacán, Coahuila, Morelos, Puebla, Durango, Zacatecas, Distrito Federal de México, Jalisco, Nuevo León, Hidalgo, Oaxaca, Tamaulipas)
 Bouteloua reederorum Columbus – Durango, Puebla, Zacatecas, Oaxaca
 Bouteloua reflexa Swallen – Sonora, Sinaloa, Baja California, Baja California Sur, Nayarit
 Bouteloua repens (Kunth) Scribn. & Merr. – slender grama –  Arizona, New Mexico, Texas, Oklahoma, Mesoamerica, Colombia, Venezuela, West Indies
 Bouteloua rigidiseta (Steud.) Hitchc. – Texas grama – New Mexico, Texas, Oklahoma, Arkansas, Louisiana, Mexico (Aguascalientes, Durango)
 Bouteloua simplex Lag. Much of southwestern and central United States, Central America, western South America
 Bouteloua scabra (Kunth) Columbus – from Hidalgo to Honduras
 Bouteloua stolonifera Scribn. – San Luis Potosí, Aguascalientes, Zacatecas
 Bouteloua swallenii Columbus – from El Salvador to Venezuela
 Bouteloua triaena (Trin. ex Spreng.) Scribn. – from Sinaloa to Guatemala
 Bouteloua trifida Thunb. – Arizona, California, Nevada, New Mexico, Texas, Utah, Mexico
 Bouteloua uniflora Vasey – Nealley grama, oneflower grama – Utah, Texas, Coahuila, Zacatecas, Nuevo León, Querétaro, Oaxaca, San Luis Potosí, Tamaulipas
 Bouteloua vaneedenii Pilg. – Cuba, Leeward Islands, Venezuela
 Bouteloua warnockii Gould & Kapadia – Warnock's grama – New Mexico, Texas, Sonora, Chihuahua, Coahuila, Nuevo León, Tamaulipas, Zacatecas
 Bouteloua williamsii Swallen – Mexico, Guatemala, Honduras

Formerly included
Some grass species, formerly classified under Bouteloua, have been reclassified under other genera including:Cathestecum ChondrosumNeobouteloua''

See also
List of Poaceae genera

References

External links
 
  Interactive Key to Bouteloua of North America

 
Bunchgrasses of North America
Bunchgrasses of South America
Grasses of North America
Grasses of South America
Poaceae genera
Taxa named by Palisot de Beauvois
Taxa named by Mariano Lagasca